Bernhard V, Lord of Lippe ( – before 1365) was a member of the House of Lippe and was Lord of Rheda from 1344 until his death.

Life 
Bernard was the son of Lord Simon I and Adelaide of Waldeck.  His eldest brother was also called Bernard V and was Prince-Bishop of Paderborn.

After his father's death in 1344, the county was divided.  Bernhard was given the area around Rheda and Lippstadt.  His brother Otto was given the area around Lemgo.

When Bernhard died around 1365, his widow initially gave his inheritance to Otto VI of Tecklenburg, the husband of her eldest daughter.  In 1366, she revoked this gift and transferred the territory to her nephew Simon III.  Otto VI, however, objected and started a feud which lasted several decades and was finally resolved in favour of the Tecklenburg family.

Marriage and issue 
Bernard V was married to Richarda of the Marck. Their children were:
 Simon (d. before 1363)
 Adelaide (d. 1392), married in 1362 to Count Otto VI of Tecklenburg
 Mechtild (d. 1365), married Count Henry II of Holstein-Rendsburg
 Heilwig

Lords of Lippe
Lords of Rheda
1290s births
1360s deaths
14th-century German nobility